Ecthoea quadricornis is a species of beetle in the family Cerambycidae, and the only species in the genus Ecthoea. It was described by Olivier in 1792.

References

Onciderini
Beetles described in 1792